Jean Barthélémy Richard (7 February 1921 – 25 January 2021) was a French historian, who specialized in medieval history. He was an authority on the Crusades, and his work on the Latin missions in Asia has been qualified as "unsurpassed". Richard was a member of the Institut de France. He was President of the prestigious Académie des Inscriptions et Belles-Lettres in 2002. He was born in Le Kremlin-Bicêtre, France in February 1921. Richard died in January 2021, two weeks shy of his 100th birthday.

Publications
Le comté de Tripoli sous la dynastie toulousaine (1102-1187), 1945
 
Les ducs de Bourgogne et la formation du duché XIe-XIVe siècle, 1954 (thèse)
Le cartulaire de Marcigny-sur-Loire (1045-1144), 1957 (thèse complémentaire)
Histoire de la Bourgogne, 1957
Chypre sous les Lusignans. Documents chypriotes des Archives du Vatican (XIVe et XVe siècles), 1962
Simon de Saint-Quentin. Histoire des Tartares, 1965
L'esprit de la croisade, 1969
La papauté et les missions d'Orient au Moyen Âge, 1977
Histoire de la Bourgogne, 1978 (dir.)
Les récits de voyages et de pèlerinages, 1981
Le livre des remembrances de la Secrète du Royaume de Chypre (1468-1469), 1983 (en coll. avec T. Papadopoullos)
Saint Louis, roi d'une France féodale, soutien de la Terre Sainte, 1983
 The Crusades: c. 1071 - c. 1291 (1999), Cambridge University Press, translated by Jean Birrell
 Histoire des croisades, Fayard, (1996)

Notes

References
Jackson, Peter. 2005. The Mongols and the West, 1221-1410. The Medieval World. Harlow, England; New York: Pearson Longman.

1921 births
2021 deaths
Members of the Académie des Inscriptions et Belles-Lettres
French medievalists
Historians of the Crusades
École Nationale des Chartes alumni
French male non-fiction writers
Winners of the Prix Broquette-Gonin (literature)
Commandeurs of the Légion d'honneur
Commandeurs of the Ordre des Palmes Académiques
Grand Officers of the Ordre national du Mérite